Atul Manibhai Mehta (born 13 December 1949) is a former Indian cricketer who played first-class cricket between 1967 and 1981.

Mehta was born in Rangoon, Burma, where his parents owned a business. A batsman and leg-spin bowler, he played Ranji Trophy cricket for Saurashtra, Bombay and Gujarat.

Mehta played in Bombay's victory in the Ranji Trophy final in 1970–71, scoring valuable runs in the lower order in the 48-run victory over Maharashtra. His highest score was 141 for Gujarat against Maharashtra in 1980–81. He was the leading scorer in the low-scoring match with 40 and 37 when Gujarat beat Bombay by 225 runs in 1977–78.

Mehta moved to the United States in the 1980s. He owns a motel in California.

References

External links
 

1949 births
Living people
Sportspeople from Yangon
Indian cricketers
Saurashtra cricketers
Mumbai cricketers
Gujarat cricketers
Indian emigrants to the United States